Robert Waterman may refer to:
 Robert Waterman (bishop) (1894–1984), Anglican bishop in Canada
 Robert Waterman (governor) (1826–1891), governor of California
 Robert Waterman (sea captain) (1808–1884), clipper ship captain
 Robert H. Waterman Jr., author and expert on management practices